Leśnica  is a village in the administrative district of Gmina Stryszów, within Wadowice County, Lesser Poland Voivodeship, in southern Poland.

References
Notes

Villages in Wadowice County